Agin-Buryat Okrug (Agyn Buryaaday Toyrog), or Aga Buryatia, is an administrative division of Zabaykalsky Krai, Russia. It was a federal subject of Russia (an autonomous okrug of Chita Oblast) until it merged with Chita Oblast to form Zabaykalsky Krai on March 1, 2008. Prior to the merger, it was called Agin-Buryat Autonomous Okrug. Its administrative center is the urban-type settlement of Aginskoye. It is one of the two Buryat okrugs in Russia, the other one is Ust-Orda Buryat Okrug of Irkutsk Oblast. 
 Area: 
 Population:

Demographics

Vital statistics
Source: Russian Federal State Statistics Service

Ethnic groups
While residents of the autonomous okrug (as of the 2002 census) identified  themselves as belonging to 54 different ethnic groups, most of them consider themselves either Buryats (62.5%) or ethnic Russians (35.1%), the Tatars at 390 (0.5%) ending up as a distant third most numerous group in the region.

See also
Administrative divisions of Agin-Buryat Autonomous Okrug

References

Zabaykalsky Krai
Buryat people
Enclaves and exclaves
Autonomous okrugs of the Soviet Union
Russian-speaking countries and territories